Ali Sabieh Region is a region in southern Djibouti. With a mainland area of 2,400 square kilometres (900 sq mi), it lies along the national border with Somaliland and Ethiopia, bordering also the Dikhil Region to the west and the Arta Region to the north. Its capital is Ali Sabieh. The Arrei Mountains are the highest point in the region.

History

Nomadic life in the Ali Sabieh Region dates back at least 2,000 years. During the Middle Ages, the Ali Sabieh Region was ruled by the Ifat Sultanate and the Adal Sultanate. It later formed a part of the French Somaliland protectorate in the first half of the 20th century. Considered the border with Ethiopia, the area had few permanent settlements at the turn of the 20th century. In 1904, a report notes that "when the border post of Ali Sabieh, it has the appearance of a fortress. Attached to the circle of "Gobad-Dikkil" from its inception in 1931, Ali Sabieh became the chief town of a circle autonomously 1939. It was briefly attached to the circle of Djibouti between 1946 and 1949. It is managed by the commander of the circle Dikhil between 1952 and 1958, before finally receive its own administration.

Overview

The region borders Arta Region to the north, the Dikhil Region to the west, and the nation of Somalia-(Somaliland) to the east, and the nation of Ethiopia to the south. Largely arid, the Ali Sabieh Region is noted for its bare plains of Grand Bara and its large Mountains. The Ali Sabieh region has old forts all round the region build by the French Army in the 20th century. The inhabitants of the Ali Sabieh region belong mainly to the people of Issa Somali clan. In 1963 during the first Somali-Ethiopian war a terrible massacre was perpetrated by the Ethiopian soldiers in Aysha, mainly populated by Issa Somali. Among the latter, those who succeeded in fleeing arrived at Dikhil and Ali-Sabieh. At Ali-Sabieh, the colonial administration installed them in a new area. In 1977: during the Ogaden War between Somalia and Ethiopia, a second wave of populations fleeing hostilities took refuge in Ali Sabieh. In 1984, A severe drought that struck the Aysha and Hadagalah regions and decimated thousands of people and hundreds of thousands of sheep and cattle caused a human flood, particularly towards Ali Sabieh. In 1991 during the Somali Civil War a fourth wave of populations came to take refuge in Ali Sabieh and also in Ali Adde and Holhol. The local commercial sector is centered on construction (cement) and storage of goods in transit to Ethiopia. Towns in the region have experienced significant growth with the increasing industrialization. The area has also seen some investment.

Geography

Ali Sabieh is the fourth largest Region in the country. It contains around 16.5% of the nation's landmass. In total area, it is larger than Mauritius and smaller than Samoa. The Arta lies to the north, and Dikhil to the west. Ali Sabieh Region also shares a border with the Somali Region of Ethiopia to the south, and the Awdal of Somalia to the east. Ali Sabieh's highest point is Arrei, which has an elevation of 4,268 ft (1,301 m). Other mountain ranges in the Region include the Boura Mountains, the Arrei Mountains, the Rahle Godle, and the Dagouein Mountain. Ali Sabieh Region has an extraordinarily diverse geography. The western half of the region is part of the coastal plain and has an exceedingly hot, humid and arid climate. The eastern half, however, is very mountainous, with the major peak being 1,301 m (4,268 ft) Arrei Mountain, near Guelile. These mountains trap the moisture created by an upper-level wind reversal between May and October, so that in the eastern half of the region annual rainfall increases from 150 millimetres in the foothills to probably more than 270 millimetres. The main wadis that cross are the wadis Dey Dey, Holl-Holl, Beye-Adey, Danan and Guestir. The Region of Ali Sabieh has 52 mountain summits with 3,000 feet (914 m) of prominence.

Economy

Activities oriented towards animal production (goat and dromedary farming) and agriculture in irrigated perimeters characterize the economy of the region. There is also the practice of small business and other informal activities. The proximity of the Ethiopian border, the railway activities linking Djibouti to Ethiopia, the storage of goods in transit to Ethiopia and the use of building materials (Ali Sabieh Cement) have made the city of Ali Sabieh a place for exchanges of cross flows. Its prospects for development are characterized by cross-border commercial dynamics and a process of industrialization. The entire region has been significantly affected by caravan activities to and from Ethiopia. The capital city concentrates almost all of the factors driving the economy. This is where all civil servants and other agents work in the decentralized departments of ministries, in public institutions. Most of the small business units (shops, grocery stores, taxis and internetcafes) are located in the city of Ali Sabieh.

Towns

References

 
Regions of Djibouti